Great Ormside is a small village in the parish of Ormside, in the Eden District, in the English county of Cumbria. It is a few miles away from the small town of Appleby-in-Westmorland. It is near the River Eden. There is also the smaller neighbouring hamlet of Little Ormside. It also has a church called St. James's Church.

Close to the church in Great Ormside, Ormside Hall is a 17th-century house which incorporates the remains of a late 14th- or early 15th-century tower house.

See also

Listed buildings in Ormside
Ormside bowl

References

External links

Great Ormside at Visit Cumbria website
St James's Church, Great Ormside at Visit Cumbria website

Villages in Cumbria
Eden District